Reginald Percival Potter (7 October 1914 – 2 July 1998) was a British water polo player. He competed in the men's tournament at the 1948 Summer Olympics.

References

External links
 

1914 births
1998 deaths
British male water polo players
Olympic water polo players of Great Britain
Water polo players at the 1948 Summer Olympics